Lawrence William Baird (born 14 December 1977) is an English and British athlete. Baird competed for his country in national and international competitions over the 400m and 4 × 400 m. In 1998 he was reserve for the 4 × 400 m relay team at the European indoor championships and part of the Ricoh tour in which he was tripped and sustained a back injury. He successfully retrained after months of rehabilitation to walk, jog and run and  once again claimed a GB vest at Kelvin Hall International.   When in 2015 he became a masters athlete Lawrence became the European 400m Master indoor champion racing in San Sebastián, Spain then the following year European outdoor 400m Champion in Izmir, Turkey. At the same meeting claiming silver over the 200m and 5th over the 100m, and two golds in the 4x100m and 4x400m. He finished second in the World Masters in 2015, was a member of the world record breaker masters 4 × 400 m men 35-40 team. He established himself as one of the best masters athletes in the world and one of only a few athletes in the world to have run sub 50 seconds over a period of 20 years consecutively.

At the 2015 World Masters Athletics Championships, he finished second in the M35 400 metres, part of a British sweep of the event.  Later he joined his sweeping compatriots, David Brown, Liam Collins and Richard Beardsell leading off the M35 world record-setting 4 × 400 metres relay team.  Their time 3:17.82.

Career
Baird gained two silver medals at the prestigious English schools champions over the 800 m and 400 m. At 13 years old Baird was ranked the fastest schoolboy over the 800 m in the United Kingdom.

After achieving his first England vest at the age of 14, he went on to compete for Great Britain in indoor and outdoor competitions and was reserve for the European indoor champions in San Sebastián. He  gained Great Britain under-20, under-23 and senior vests along with Great Britain universities vest, England senior indoor vest, and Great Britain senior indoor vests.

At the age of 24, a serious back injury prevented Lawrence from racing, but he made a comeback to gain a senior indoor 400 m vest at Kelvin Hall Scotland. He raced for county and club before moving into the masters category.

Teaching career

Baird taught at Wolfreton after gaining his teaching QTS degree from Sheffield Hallam University in 1999. Moving to a 5-year teaching role at Lindsey School Cleethorpes.  Promotion to Monks Dyke college saw Baird become an innovative leader of primary physical education under the management of Alan Grantham( award-winning school games organiser). Baird was part of a  international programmes in Africa working with the British Council. He also designed a leadership course for students aged 11–16 and during work at Monks Dyke researching gifted and talented education, publishing his work as 'taking the lead'. He became head of physical at Birkbeck College before establishing S Support and moving into primary physical education and creating junior fitness centres.

Baird created S Support limited (sport support limited), which was the first UK provider of kinaesthetic motion learning desks and junior fitness education (FitCoach) in the UK. This was linked to the American company kids fit.

References

1977 births
Living people
English male middle-distance runners